Mesovracho (before 1927: Ζέλεγκραδ - Zelegkrad) is a village in Kastoria Regional Unit, Western Macedonia, Greece.

The Greek census (1920) recorded 260 people in the village and in 1923 there were 230 inhabitants (or 40 families) who were Muslim. Following the Greek-Turkish population exchange, in 1926 within Zelegkrad there were 18 refugee families from Pontus. The Greek census (1928) recorded 93 village inhabitants. There were 18 refugee families (72 people) in 1928.

References

Populated places in Kastoria (regional unit)